The Nashua Street Jail, also known as the Suffolk County Jail, is a jail located in Boston, Massachusetts. It opened on Memorial Day in 1990 as a replacement for the overcrowded Charles Street Jail, located half a mile to the southwest. This facility houses almost 744 pre-trial detainees in 13 different housing units. The jail has 453 cells containing 654 individual beds. The entire facility is maximum security. On August 15, 2010, Philip Markoff, the so-called "Craiglist Killer", committed suicide while in detention there.

References

External links

Jails in Massachusetts
Government buildings in Boston
County government buildings in Massachusetts